Černé oči, proč pláčete...?  is a 1930 Czechoslovak comedy film  directed by Leo Marten.

Cast
Frank Argus   
Milka Balek-Brodská   
Filip Balek-Brodský   
Sasa Dobrovolná ...  Anna Novotna 
Eman Fiala   
Ludmila Folprechtova   
Antonín Fric   
Jaro Hykman ...  Marcel Novotny 
Mary Jansová   
Mario Karas  
Jindrich Lhoták ...  Jarsky 
Václav Pecián  
Karel Schleichert   
Ferry Seidl   
Čeněk Šlégl ...  Maj. von Rohrerich 
Eduard Slégl   
Jan W. Speerger ...  Pavel Cermak 
Otto Zahrádka ...  Trnka

External links 
 

1930 films
1930s Czech-language films
1930 comedy films
Czechoslovak black-and-white films
Czechoslovak comedy films
1930s Czech films